Sippel is a surname. Notable people with the surname include:

Birgit Sippel (born 1960), German politician and Member of the European Parliament from Germany
Jeffrey Sippel, American printmaker
Lothar Sippel (born 1965), German football coach
Peter Sippel (born 1969), German former football referee 
Rodney W. Sippel (born 1956), Chief Judge of the United States District
Tobias Sippel (born 1988), German footballer 
Willi Sippel (born 1929), German former footballer

See also
Joe Sippel Weir, on Barambah Creek, west of Murgon, Queensland, Australia

References